West End Brewery may refer to:

West End Brewery (Hindley Street), brewery founded in Adelaide in 1857, taken over by the South Australian Brewing Company in 1888
The premises in Hindley Street after the takeover by the South Australian Brewing Company
The premises at 107 Port Road, Thebarton, after the sale of the Hindley Street building in 1980, later rebadged by the Lion company as West End